Peale may refer to:

People

Surname
 Albert Charles Peale (1849–1914), American geologist, mineralogist and paleobotanist
 Anna Claypoole Peale (1791–1878), American miniature painter, daughter of James Peale
 Charles Willson Peale (1741–1827), American painter, soldier and naturalist
 James Peale (1749–1831), American painter, best known for his miniature and still-life paintings, brother of Charles Willson Peale
 Margaretta Angelica Peale (1795–1882), American Painter, daughter of James Peale
 Maria Peale (1787–1866), American painter, and daughter of James Peale
 Mary Jane Peale (1827 - 1902), American painter, daughter of Rubens and Eliza Burd Patterson Peale
 Norman Vincent Peale (1898–1993), American Christian preacher and author
 Raphaelle Peale (1774–1825), American painter of still-life, son of Charles Willson Peale
 Rembrandt Peale (1778–1860), American neoclassical painter, son of Charles Willson Peale
 Rubens Peale (1784 – 1865), American artist and museum director, son of Charles Willson Peale
 Sarah Miriam Peale (1800–1885), American portrait painter, daughter of James Peale
 Titian Peale (1799–1885), American artist, naturalist, entomologist and photographer, son of Charles Willson Peale

Given name
 John Peale Bishop (1892–1944), American poet and man of letters
 Charles Peale Polk (1767–1822), American portrait painter

Animals
 Peale's dolphin, a dolphin found near the southern tip of South America
 Peale's falcon, a subspecies of peregrine falcon
 Peale's free-tailed bat, a bat of South and Central America

Other uses
 Mount Peale, the highest peak in the Manti-La Sal National Forest, Utah, United States
 Peale, Pennsylvania, a ghost town in Clearfield County, United States
 Peale House, the building housing the office of the President of La Salle University, Philadelphia, Pennsylvania, United States
 Peale Museum, a museum of painting and natural history in Baltimore, Maryland, United States

See also
 Colonial families of Maryland
 Peel (disambiguation)
 Peele (disambiguation)